A reformer is someone who works for reform.

Reformer may also refer to:
Catalytic reformer, in an oil refinery
Methane reformer, producing hydrogen
Steam reformer
Hydrogen reformer, extracting hydrogen
Methanol reformer, producing hydrogen from methanol
Kim reformer, producing syngas
Protestant Reformers
Reformers Bookshop, Australia
Reformer (Enneagram), a personality type
Pilates reformer, an exercise machine
The Reformers (film), 1916
Reform movement